The Belizean reef mangroves ecoregion (WWF ID: NT1406) covers the mangrove habitats along the islands and cayes of the Belize Barrier Reef.  This ecoregion is distinct from the mainland Belizean Coast mangroves ecoregion, and may be considered a sub-unit of the overall Mesoamerican Gulf-Caribbean mangroves ecoregion.

Location and description
The mangrove habitats of this ecoregion are associated with the islands along the 220 km Belize barrier reef, stretching from the Mexico border south; the ecoregion also extends across three coral atolls (Turneffe Atoll, Lighthouse Reef and Glover's Reef), sea grass beds and some coastal lagoons.

Climate
The climate of the ecoregion is Tropical savanna climate - dry winter (Köppen climate classification (Aw)). This climate is characterized by relatively even temperatures throughout the year, and a pronounced dry season.

Flora and fauna
The most common mangrove tree species in this ecoregion is the red mangrove (Rhizophora mangle), with some white mangrove (Laguncularia racemosa, black mangrove (Avicennia germinans), and coconut palms (Cocos nucifera).

Mammals of conservation interest include the vulnerable West Indian manatee (Trichechus manatus), the endangered green sea turtle (Chelonia mydas), the critically endangered hawksbill sea turtle (Eretmochelys imbricata), the vulnerable loggerhead sea turtle (Caretta caretta), and the vulnerable American crocodile (Crocodylus acutus).  The ecoregion supports significant bird colonies, including the red-footed booby (Sula sula), brown booby (Sula leucogaster), and the brown ('common') noddy (Anous stolidus).

Protected areas
About 12% of the land area of the Belizean Barrier Reefs are officially protect, a portion of which is mangrove habitat.  Protected areas in this ecoregion include:
 Bacalar Chico National Park and Marine Reserve
 Great Blue Hole National Monument
 Half Moon Caye National Monument

References

Neotropical ecoregions
Ecoregions of Belize
Ecoregions of Mexico